The Traditional Protestant Episcopal Church (TPEC) was a small jurisdiction of the Continuing Anglican movement. It was founded in 1991 by Richard G. Melli, formerly a priest of the Anglican Catholic Church, Diocese of the South. This Christian church body saw itself as maintaining the original doctrine, discipline, and worship of the Protestant Episcopal Church in the United States of America and the evangelical, Protestant, and Reformed faith of historic Anglicanism.[citation needed] 

The TPEC, which had one diocese that was named Diocese of the Advent, subscribed to the authority of Holy Scripture and the Thirty-nine Articles of Religion.[citation needed] The 1928 Book of Common Prayer was used and assent was given to the 1954 revision of the Constitution and Canons of the PECUSA. At its inception, the church consisted of twelve congregations, primarily low church "Morning Prayer" parishes, and as many clergy.[citation needed]

In September 2011, TPEC's Presiding Bishop, Charles E. Morley, and Canterbury Chapel in Fairhope, Alabama, were received by Presiding Bishop Jerry L. Ogles into the Anglican Orthodox Church.

References

External links 
 Church website - Archived

1986 establishments in the United States
2011 disestablishments in the United States
Anglican denominations in North America
Continuing Anglican denominations
Religious organizations disestablished in 2011
Christian organizations established in 1986